Aberdare Low Level railway station served the town of Aberdare in Wales. Opened by the Taff Vale Railway, it became part of the Great Western Railway during the Grouping of 1923.

The site today
Aberdare is now served by Aberdare railway station, a new station opened on the site of the former high level station in 1988.  The station here was demolished after the line through it closed in 1973; coal traffic from Tower Colliery at Hirwaun was then re-routed over a new connection onto the former Vale of Neath Railway line near  to allow for the removal of the busy level crossing here.  The station buildings subsequently burned down in 1982 and the site was redeveloped - it is now occupied by the town bus station.

References

Sources

Disused railway stations in Rhondda Cynon Taf
Former Taff Vale Railway stations
Beeching closures in Wales
Railway stations in Great Britain opened in 1846
Railway stations in Great Britain closed in 1964
1846 establishments in Wales
railway station, low level